Several natural structures are named Cathedral Cavern:

Australia
Cathedral Cavern, Queensland

Spain 
Cathedral Cavern, Minorca

United Kingdom
Cathedral Cavern, Lake District
Cathedral Cavern, Llanfair, Wales

United States
Cathedral Caverns State Park, in Woodville, Alabama

See also
Cathedral Caves, a series of sea caves in southern New Zealand